The Staffordshire County League (South) was an English football league that existed from 1892 until 1996 and catered for clubs in the South Staffordshire area.  It was also known at various times as the Walsall & District Junior League, Walsall & District League, and Walsall Senior League.

History
The league was formed as the Walsall & District Junior League in May 1892 following a meeting of representatives of various local clubs at the People's Coffee House in Walsall.  The nine founder members were Bloxwich Strollers, Brownhills Albion, Cannock Town, Cotterill's (Darlaston), Lichfield Leomansley, Tettenhall Wood, Walsall Rangers, Wolverhampton Presbyterians and Wolverhampton St Chad's, but Lichfield Leomansley and Walsall Rangers withdrew during the 1892–93 season and their playing records were removed.  Brownhills Albion won the inaugural championship, losing only one of their twelve matches.  In 1897 the league dropped the word "Junior" from its title, as its member clubs were felt to be of a higher standard than the name suggested.  A new Walsall & District Junior League was formed the following year for lesser clubs.  As with many other leagues in this era, clubs left the league and new clubs joined almost every season, with the league fluctuating in size every year.  In 1908 a Second Division was added, but it lasted for only one season.  The league then began to decline in size until in the 1913–14 season only five teams competed, and one of those resigned after only three matches.  After that season, the league shut down for the duration of the First World War.

The league resumed in 1920 with 15 member clubs, including the reserve teams of a number of more senior clubs, and a year later was renamed the Walsall Senior League.  Following the 1922–23 season, however, a number of clubs resigned to join the Birmingham Combination and the league closed down once again, owing to insufficient numbers.  It resumed play in 1930, once again as the Walsall & District League, but once again gradually declined in size, as clubs found it hard to continue during the difficult economic conditions of the 1930s.  The league once again shut down during the Second World War.

After the war the league once again adopted the Walsall Senior League name, but in 1950 adopted its final name of the Staffordshire County League (South).  In the early 1950s the competition was dominated by Shelfield Athletic, who won the league for five consecutive seasons.  A Second Division was again added in 1956, but once again it only lasted for one season.

Champions
Walsall & District Junior League

Walsall & District League

Division Two was added in 1908.

Division Two was abandoned after one season.

The League was inactive between 1914 and 1920.

Walsall Senior League

The League was inactive between 1923 and 1930.

Walsall & District League

The League was inactive from 1939 until 1945

Walsall Senior League

Staffordshire County League (South)

Division Two was added in 1956.

Division Two was abandoned after one season.

Division Two was added in 1964.

Division Two was abandoned after one season.

Division Two was added in 1969.

In 1974 Division One was renamed the Premier Division and Division Two was renamed Division One.

The League was reduced to a single division in 1993.

The League folded in 1996.

References
General

Specific

 
Defunct football leagues in England
Football in Staffordshire
1892 establishments in England
1996 disestablishments in England
Sports leagues established in 1892
Sports leagues disestablished in 1996